Gianfranco de Taddeo (born 7 August 1928) is a Swiss former footballer who played in the 1950s. He played as goalkeeper.

De Taddeo first played for La Chaux-de-Fonds in the 1949–50 Nationalliga A season. He then played three seasons for BSC Young Boys.

He then joined Basel's first team for their 1953–54 season under player-coach René Bader. After playing in seven test games, de Taddeo played his domestic league debut for his new club in the away game on 21 March 1953 as Basel were defeated 1–2 by Grenchen. In that one season that he was with the club, de Taddeo played a total of 13 games for Basel. Five of these games were in the Nationalliga A and eight were friendly games.

Following his season with Basel, de Taddeo moved on to play two seasons for Cantonal Neuchatel. He played three seasons for BSC Old Boys and then ended his active football career playing for Young Fellows Zürich.

References

Sources
 Die ersten 125 Jahre. Publisher: Josef Zindel im Friedrich Reinhardt Verlag, Basel. 
 Verein "Basler Fussballarchiv" Homepage

FC Basel players
FC La Chaux-de-Fonds players
BSC Young Boys players
Neuchâtel Xamax FCS players
BSC Old Boys players
SC Young Fellows Juventus players
Swiss men's footballers
Association football goalkeepers
1928 births
Living people